Alexander Viktorovich Kondrashov (born November 21, 1983) is a Russian travel blogger, explorer and writer. He is known primarily for his YouTube channel, Alexander Kondrashov, with 1.3 million subscribers as of November 2018.

Early life 
Kondrashov was born in Prague, Czechia. His father was a soldier and his mother was a school teacher. At age 5, his family moved to a military town near Mozhaysk. He graduated from the military academy and later from the Automatics and Electronics department of National Research Nuclear University MEPhI (Moscow Engineering Physics Institute). He is married to a woman named Anastasiya.

Career 
In 2007, after 3 years of working in Konzern Transmash, Alexander opened a business selling and renting railroad cars.

On March 17, 2011, he launched the YouTube channel Justdoit150gmail. By November 2018, the channel had gained 1.3 million subscribers, more than 320 million views and was one of the top Russian travel blogs. His most popular video is “What would happen if we put crabs with piranhas,” with more than 21 million views.

In 2016, Alexander took part in a live video conference with Vladimir Putin from Antarctica and was invited by the Department of Tourism of Estonia to record a video review in Tallinn. In 2016 he took part in the reality show Bloggers a la Fleet by Wargaming.net, where video bloggers traveled for 6 days sailing on the ship Kruzenshtern.  A televised version of the project was broadcast by the Belarusian TV channel, ONT, in January 2017.

In 2017, Alexander founded his advertising agency BloggersMedia to produce YouTube channels and Instagram blogs. In August 2017, together with the Mamont Cup 2017 expedition, he visited the Shantar Islands and documented the operation to save a bowhead whale trapped in a conduit of Bolshoye lake on Big Shantar Island in Okhotsk Sea.

In 2018, at the request of Rosturizm, Kondrashov visited the cities of the FIFA World Cup 2018 for which he made video guides.

Recognition 
 YouTube Silver Play Button (2013)
 YouTube Gold Play Button (2018)
 GQ Travel Awards 2018 nomination (Best Travel Blogger)

Bibliography 
 Life in motion. How to achieve success while remaining true to yourself. — Moscow.: Eksmo, 2019. — 352 pages, ill.

References

External links 

 
 
 
 
 

Russian bloggers
Russian explorers
1983 births
Living people